Andrejs Koroļevs (born 30 July 1969) is a former motorcycle speedway rider from Latvia. Since 1996, he raced on a Polish licence after gaining Polish citizenship and was known as Andrzej Korolew.

Speedway Grand Prix results

Honours

World Championships
Individual World Championship (Speedway Grand Prix)
2006 - 34th place (0 points)
Individual U-21 World Championship
1990 -  Lviv - track reserve (3 points)
Team World Championship (Speedway World Cup)
2003 - 3rd place in Qualifying round
2008 - 3rd place in Qualifying Round 1

European Championships
European Pairs Championship
2005 -  Gdańsk - 7th place (2 points)
European Club Champions' Cup
2001 -  Daugavpils - Bronze medal (10 points)
2002 -  Pardubice - 5th place (3 points)
2006 -  Tarnów - 4th place (4 points)
2008 -  Slaný - 4th place (6 points)

See also
Latvia national speedway team
List of Speedway Grand Prix riders
Speedway in Poland

References

External links
(ru) Lokomotive Daugavpils webside

Latvian speedway riders
Latvian emigrants to Poland
Polish speedway riders
Sportspeople from Baku
1969 births
Living people
Naturalized citizens of Poland